EXID's Showtime is a South Korean documentary starring the popular girl group EXID. It is the fifth season of the South Korean reality show series, Showtime.

Background 
EXID's Showtime is a reality TV show that allows the fans to see behind-the-scenes of EXID's daily lives.

References

External links
 

South Korean reality television series
EXID